House of Gold may refer to:

Film
The House of Gold, a 1918 American silent film
House of Gold (film), a 2013 Ghanaian Nigerian film

Music
"A House of Gold", a song by Hank Williams, 1954
"House of Gold" (Twenty One Pilots song), 2011